Ellerker is a village and civil parish in the East Riding of Yorkshire, England.

Ellerker may refer also to:

People
Ellerker Bradshaw (1680–1742), British politician who sat in the House of Commons between 1727 and 1741
Edward Ellerker (c. 1537–1586), English politician
Ralph Ellerker (died 1546), English soldier, knight and Member of Parliament
Thomas Ellerker (1738–1795), English Jesuit
William Henry Ellerker (died 1891), Australian architect and politician